Seeley Cottage is a historic cure cottage located at Saranac Lake in the town of Harrietstown, Franklin County, New York.  It was built about 1890 and is a -story, side-gable-roofed, wood frame dwelling on a raised basement with clapboard, aluminum, and asbestos siding.  There is a sizable 2-story rear wing.  It features a large open verandah with two sizable cure porches on top.  It operated for many years as a private sanatorium.

It was listed on the National Register of Historic Places in 1992.

References

Houses on the National Register of Historic Places in New York (state)
Queen Anne architecture in New York (state)
Colonial Revival architecture in New York (state)
Houses completed in 1890
Houses in Franklin County, New York
National Register of Historic Places in Franklin County, New York